The following is a list of the MTV Europe Music Award winners and nominees for Best Canadian Act.

Winners and nominees
Winners are listed first and highlighted in bold.

2010s

2020s

See also 
 MTV VMA International Viewer's Choice Award for MTV Canada

References 

Canadian Act
Awards established in 2013
Canadian music awards